The Chronicle of the Abbey of St. Edmunds is a chronicle setting the history of the Abbey at Bury St Edmunds,
between the years 1173 and 1202.

The chronicle was written in 1198.
by Jocelin of Brakelond, a monk who lived in the abbey of Bury St. Edmunds, Suffolk.

See also
Jocelyn de Brakelond
Bury St Edmunds Abbey

References

History books about England
Works by English writers
English non-fiction literature
English chronicles
13th century in England
12th century in England
13th-century Latin books
12th-century Latin books
History of Suffolk
Bury St Edmunds